Novoye Ivanayevo (Yaña İvanay) is a rural locality (a village) in Yekaterininsky Rural Settlement, Novosheshminsky District, Tatarstan, Russia. Population:

Geography 

History 
Novoye Ivanayevo was founded in the first half of the 18th century.

Demographics 
Novoye Ivanayevo had a population of 243 in 2002 and 198 in 2010.

References 

Rural localities in Tatarstan